T. nivalis may refer to:
 Taeniopteryx nivalis, a stone fly species
 Titanoeca nivalis, a spider species